Road Maps And Heart Attacks is the debut studio album from rock band This Time Next Year. It was released on October 20, 2009 through Equal Vision Records. The album was produced by Brian McTernan, who worked with The Movielife. On April 7, 2010, it was announced the band made Road Maps and Heart Attacks available for pay-what-you-want download.

Track listing 
"Rise and Fall, Curtain Call" - 2:19
"New Sensation" - 2:28
"Alex in Wonderland" - 3:43
"New Florence" - 2:08
"Rhyme and Reason" - 2:34
"No Bed of Broken Glass" - 2:42
"Calling in Dead" - 2:56
"Liquid Diet" - 3:04
"Mischief with No Direction" - 3:12
"Out on Eastern" - 2:38
"Cheers to a Late Night" - 3:33

References

2009 albums
Equal Vision Records albums
Albums produced by Brian McTernan